Babička Gora (Бабичка Гора) is a mountain in southern Serbia, near the city of Leskovac. Its highest peak, Kriva buka has an elevation of 1,059 meters above sea level.

Gallery

References

Mountains of Serbia